Elizabeth Anne Kellogg (born 1951) is an American botanist who now works mainly on grasses and cereals, both wild and cultivated.  She earned a Ph.D. from Harvard University in 1983, and was professor of Botanical Studies  at the  University of Missouri - St. Louis from September 1998 to December 2013. Since 2013 she has been part of the Kellogg Lab at the  Donald Danforth Plant Science Center in Missouri, where  she is principal investigator In 2020 she was elected a member of the National Academy of Sciences.

She is married to Peter Francis Stevens.

Names published 

(List incomplete: 19 names published)
 Dendrophthora lacryma-jobi E.A.Kellogg, Novon 6: 35, fig (1996).
 Henriettea lateriflora (Vahl) R.A.Howard & E.A.Kellogg, J. Arnold Arbor. 67: 246 (1986).
 Miconia secunda R.A.Howard & E.A.Kellogg, J. Arnold Arbor. 67: 250 (1986).
 Phoradendron diminutivum E.A.Kellogg, Novon 6: 41, fig (1996).
 Phoradendron triflorum E.A.Kellogg, Novon 6: 44, fig (1996).
 Rondeletia anguillensis R.A.Howard & E.A.Kellogg, J. Arnold Arbor. 68: 127 (-129), fig (1987).
Tripidium arundinaceum (Retz.) Welker, Voronts. & E.A.Kellogg, Taxon 68(2): 255 (2019).

(These may not be accepted names.)

Publications

Books

Articles
Petersen, K. B.; Kellogg, E. A. (2022). Diverse ecological functions and the convergent evolution of grass awns. American Journal of Botany. 109 (9): 1331–1345. doi:10.1002/ajb2.16060.

References

1951 births
American women botanists
University of Missouri–St. Louis faculty
Harvard University alumni
Living people
Members of the United States National Academy of Sciences
21st-century American women